Morell  is a rural municipality in Prince Edward Island, Canada. It is located in Kings County east of Bristol.

Morell is located on St. Peter's Bay, two kilometres inland from St. Peter's Bay, a sub-basin of the Gulf of St. Lawrence. The local economy is centred on farming (wild blueberry farms), fishing (Lobster), aquaculture (Mussels), and tourism. It was incorporated in 1953.

Most of the area residents are of Scottish, English, Irish, or French descent. The first inhabitants of the community of Morell were Maritime Archaic Indians followed by the Mi'kmaq Nation. The Morell River was known to the Mi'kmaq as Pogooseemkekseboo, meaning "clam ground river".

The community was named for Jean Francois Morel who settled in the area in 1720-21, having arrived from Saint-Malo, France. Local attractions include the nearby Rodd Crowbush Golf & Beach Resort.

Demographics 

References 

Communities in Kings County, Prince Edward Island
Rural municipalities in Prince Edward Island
Populated places established in 1720
1720 establishments in the French colonial empire